The Legend Continues may refer:
Anchorman: The Legend Continues
Dragonworld: The Legend Continues, a 1999 Adventure fantasy film. It is a Direct-to-video sequel to the original 1994 film, Dragonworld. The film was actually originally filmed in 1996, but did not see a release until 1999
Kung Fu: The Legend Continues, a spin-off of the 1972–1975 television series Kung Fu
 The Legend Continues (album)